The black paradisefish (Macropodus spechti) is a species of gourami endemic to Vietnam. It is an inhabitant of hill streams, lowland streams, and irrigation ditches in farmland. It is found in the Thu Bon River and Perfume River; its habitat is hill streams, along backwaters of large rivers and small stream and irrigation channels on farmland. Aside from possibly being used as an ornamental fish, nothing else is known about the species.

References

black paradisefish
Endemic fauna of Vietnam
Fish of Vietnam
black paradisefish